A Ship Is Born is a 1942 short WWII propaganda film produced by Warner Bros. about the U.S. Merchant Marine. It was nominated for an Academy Award for Best Documentary Feature in 1943.

See also 
 List of Allied propaganda films of World War II

References

External links 
 
 
 A Ship Is Born at the National Archives and Records Administration

1942 short films
1940s war films
American World War II propaganda shorts
American black-and-white films
Films scored by William Lava
American war films
1942 documentary films
American short documentary films
1940s short documentary films
Warner Bros. short films
1940s American films